is a Japanese manga series written by Hideo Yamamoto and illustrated by Ryoichi Ikegami. It was serialized in Shogakukan's seinen manga magazine Big Comic Superior from October 2015 to July 2016.

Publication
Adam and Eve, written by Hideo Yamamoto and illustrated by Ryoichi Ikegami, was serialized in Shogakukan's seinen manga magazine Big Comic Superior from October 9, 2015, to July 22, 2016. Shogakukan collected its chapters in two tankōbon volumes, released from February 29 to August 30, 2016.

The manga is licensed in France by Kazé.

Volume list

References

Further reading

External links
 

Seinen manga
Shogakukan manga
Yakuza in anime and manga